Zale declarans, the Dixie zale, is an owlet moth in the family Erebidae. The species was first described by Francis Walker in 1858. It is found in North America.

The MONA or Hodges number for Zale declarans is 8691.

References

Further reading

 
 
 

Omopterini
Articles created by Qbugbot
Moths described in 1858